Ghasem Sholeh-Saadi is a former member of Iranian parliament and a professor of law at the University of Tehran.

Electoral history

References

Living people
Academic staff of the University of Tehran
Members of the 3rd Islamic Consultative Assembly
Members of the 4th Islamic Consultative Assembly
1954 births